Bank of Azad Jammu & Kashmir is the state-owned bank of Government of Azad Kashmir  which is based in Muzaffarabad, Azad Kashmir. It was founded in 2005.

The bank has 80 branches all of which are located in Azad Kashmir.

Record bigh assets
The total assets value of the bank reached the highest level  in the first six months of the 2022 calendar year, hence setting a record in the institutions 15-year history.

See also

 Economy of Azad Kashmir

References

Banks of Pakistan
Economy of Azad Kashmir
Muzaffarabad District
Pakistani companies established in 2005
Banks established in 2005
Government-owned banks of Pakistan